Trox minutus is an extinct species of hide beetle in the subfamily Troginae.

References

minutus
Beetles described in 2008